Holy Cross is a Catholic secondary school in St. Catharines, Ontario. The school is administered by the Niagara Catholic District School Board.

History
Holy Cross was founded in 1985. Originally known as P.K. Kerwin (named after an area lawyer who had donated the property the school was constructed on), it was built at 541 Lake Street, as a senior Elementary School, serving only grades seven and eight. Grades nine and ten were later added, but in 1984, grade 11 classes were offered under the name of Denis Morris Catholic High School, Kerwin Campus. In September 1985, re-christened as Holy Cross Secondary School, the facility now offered grade twelve classes as well, while grades seven and eight had been eliminated. In 1993, due to overcrowding, Holy Cross relocated to the former Grantham High School building, which was shut down by the District School Board of Niagara that same year due to declining enrollment. The former Holy Cross building would become St. Francis Catholic Secondary School.

In 2015
In 2015, Jean-Paul Dupont, and in 2019, Catherine Chin Yet, teachers at Holy Cross Catholic Secondary School, were awarded the Prime Minister's Awards for Teaching Excellence.

Sports

Lacrosse
Between 1996 and 2011, the school had just two losses in Niagara region play. The team is currently coached by NLL player Mike Accursi and physical education teacher Dave Walker. The team was ranked #1 in Canada for three years straight on Laxpower (2007–2009), and were ranked #124 in North America as of June 6, 2009.

Championships:
 Twelve Niagara Region AAA/AAAA championships: 1997–2001, 2003, 2005–2009.
 Three OFSAA championships:
1997 - Fourth
1998 - Silver
1999 - Gold
2000 - Silver
2001 - Gold
2002 - Bronze
2003 - Bronze
2005 - Gold
2006 - Silver
2007 - Bronze
2008 - Bronze
2009 - Silver
2010 - Silver (A/AA division)

Hockey
The Holy Cross hockey team has had various success in Southern Ontario play in recent years. They won the SOSSA championship three years in a row (2000–2002), and again in 2008 (now in the A-AA division.)

in 2019 the Girls varsity hockey team were crowned SOSSA champions after going undefeated.  They were favorited to win the OFSA championship.  However, the remaining competitions were cancelled due to COVID-19.

Notable alumni

Craig Conn (2001), lacrosse player
Rob Davison, hockey player
Kristen French, murder victim of Karla Homolka and Paul Bernardo
Sean Greenhalgh (2000), lacrosse player
Steve Priolo, professional lacrosse player
Corey Small (2005), lacrosse player
Billy Dee Smith, lacrosse player
Matt Vinc (2000), lacrosse player
Buffy-Lynne Williams (1995), rower

See also
List of high schools in Ontario

References

External links
 Official site

Catholic secondary schools in Ontario
High schools in the Regional Municipality of Niagara
Educational institutions established in 1985
Buildings and structures in St. Catharines
Education in St. Catharines
1985 establishments in Ontario